The longfin boarfish (Zanclistius elevatus), also known as the blackspot boarfish,  is a species of marine ray-finned fish, an armourhead from the family Pentacerotidae which is native to the coasts of southern Australia, Tasmania and New Zealand. It can also be found in the aquarium trade, and is currently the only known member of the genus Zanclistius.

References

Monotypic fish genera
Pentacerotidae